Esala Masi (born 9 March 1974) is a retired Fijian footballer, who played as a striker.

Club career
Masi began his football career at his hometown club Ba before he signed with National Soccer League (NSL) club Gippsland Falcons in January 1996. The next year, Masi transferred to Wollongong Wolves and helped them win the 1999-2000 NSL title. He spent three seasons at Wollongong, gaining 77 appearances and 19 goals.

After the NSL was disbanded in 2004, he played for several teams in Australia's state league and Malaysia.

In 2006, Masi joined National Premier Leagues Victoria side Oakleigh Cannons FC. In the 2007 season, he finished as the top scorer of the league, scoring 15 goals.

In December 2008, Masi played against LA Galaxy in an exhibition match in New Zealand as part of an Oceania XI All-Star team.

In December 2015, Masi was appointed the coach of Mitchelton FC reserve team.

International career
Masi played international football for Fiji at Under-15, Under-20 and Under-23 levels. He made his full international debut on 7 June 1997 in a 1–0 loss against New Zealand in qualification for the 1998 FIFA World Cup. However, his international career is not well documented. Therefore, his exact appearances and goals totals are unknown. According to an interview he gave to Queensland Soccer News, he appeared over 50 times for Fiji, and also won two Melanesia Cups.

He was also captain for Fiji during the 2003 South Pacific Games. In the gold-medal match against New Caledonia, he scored Fiji's second goal from a 35-metre free-kick in a 2-0 victory. Fiji won the gold medal with Masi finishing as the tournament's top scorer with eleven goals.

International goals 
Scores and results list Fiji's goal tally first.

Personal life
His uncle, the late Esala Masi Sr. was also a Fiji international football player in the 1960s; he died in 2010. His cousin, Manoa Masi has also played in Australia and the national team.

Honours
Wollongong Wolves
National Soccer League: 1999–2000

Altona Magic
National Premier Leagues Victoria: 2008

Mitchelton FC
Capital League 1: 2013

Fiji
Melanesia Cup: 1998, 2000
Pacific Games: 2003

Individual
Pacific Games Golden Boot: 2003
National Premier Leagues Victoria Golden Boot: 2007

References

External links

1974 births
Living people
People from Ba Province
Fijian footballers
Fiji international footballers
Fijian expatriate footballers
National Soccer League (Australia) players
Navua F.C. players
Wollongong Wolves FC players
I-Taukei Fijian people
Ba F.C. players
Gippsland Falcons players
Sydney Olympic FC players
Johor Darul Ta'zim F.C. players
Oakleigh Cannons FC players
Frankston Pines F.C. players
1998 OFC Nations Cup players
2002 OFC Nations Cup players
2004 OFC Nations Cup players
Association football forwards
Expatriate footballers in Malaysia
Expatriate soccer players in Australia
Fijian expatriate sportspeople in Malaysia
Fijian expatriate sportspeople in Australia